Doe Pond may refer to:

 Doe Pond (Limekiln Lake, New York)
 Doe Pond (Big Moose, New York)